Oliver Samuel Crankshaw (born 12 August 1998) is an English professional footballer who plays as a winger for Motherwell, on loan from Stockport County.

Career
Crankshaw started his career with Preston North End before joining Northern Premier sides Ramsbottom United and then Clitheroe. In October 2017 Crankshaw joined Colne where he caught the eye, scoring 13 goals in 30 appearances. During this time he also played for Morecambe's under-23 squad. His good form for Colne and Morecambe earned him a move to National League North side Curzon where he continued to impress leading to an extended trial with Championship side Wigan Athletic. In January 2019 Crankshaw signed for Wigan and returned to Curzon on loan for the remainder of the season.

In January 2020 Crankshaw was loaned out to Dundee for the remainder of the season. He scored his first goal for the club on 10 March at home against Ayr United, in what would be the final game of the season due to its early finish caused by the COVID-19 pandemic.

Crankshaw made his debut for The Latics in an EFL Cup match against Fleetwood Town in September 2020. He scored his first goals for Wigan when he scored twice in a 6–1 EFL Trophy win over Liverpool U21s on 22 September.

Crankshaw signed for Bradford City on 1 February 2021, and he scored on his debut for against Exeter City on 6 February.

He signed for Stockport County in September. and made his debut in a 2-1 win away to Weymouth on 2nd October in which he scored the winning goal. Crankshaw would go on to win the National League with Stockport at the end of the season.

On 12 January 2023, Crankshaw would join Scottish Premiership club Motherwell on loan until the end of the season.

Career statistics

Honours
Stockport County
National League: 2021–22

References

External links
 Profile at Database4football
 Profile at Stockport County F.C.

1998 births
Living people
Footballers from Preston, Lancashire
English footballers
Association football midfielders
Wigan Athletic F.C. players
Curzon Ashton F.C. players
Preston North End F.C. players
Colne F.C. players
Ramsbottom United F.C. players
Clitheroe F.C. players
Dundee F.C. players
Bradford City A.F.C. players
Stockport County F.C. players
Motherwell F.C. players
English Football League players
National League (English football) players
Northern Premier League players
Scottish Professional Football League players